Although Italy and India have maintained important relations since ancient times, significant Indian migration to Italy is a recent phenomenon. Many Indians began immigrating to Italy in the early 1990s, when the Italian government initiated programs to get Indian IT professionals and engineers to contribute to the technology sector in Italy. Most Indian immigrants came to Italy legally.

Many came from the Punjab as entrepreneurs who are incredibly active in the restaurant and retail fields associated with Italy's large tourism industry. About half of the total Indian migrant population in Italy live in the central and northern regions of the country, especially in the cities of Rome and Milan. Lombardy hosts the most important Indian community with 47,743 people.

As a high-achieving model minority, the Indian community has integrated successfully into Italian life, and local authorities and people are impressed with their contributions to the Italian economy. They have been found to be generally industrious, business-minded, entrepreneurial and law-abiding.

Most Indians have retained their religious practices, namely Hinduism, Sikhism and Islam. There are numerous temples and gurdwaras as well as ISKCON centres. There are also many Christians from Kerala.

Dairy Industry

The production of many Italian cheeses, including Parmigiano-Reggiano, Grana Padano, and mozzarella, depends significantly on immigrant labour. Starting in the 1990s, Indians have come to dominate the labour force of the Italian dairy industry in this niche. Indeed, 60% of the workers in the Parmesan industry are Sikh.

Most Indians in Italy settle in the north of the country and work in agriculture. The Po Valley is similar in climate to the Punjab, where most of these Sikh workers are from. Their first jobs tend to be directly with the cows and buffalos, as many come from farming families, but some move on to become cheesemakers, which is better paying.

it:Coldiretti, which Politico Europe describes as Italy's most important farming union and civic authorities in the region acknowledge that the immigrants are indispensable for agriculture in general and the dairy industry in particular. The dairy workers themselves (bergamini) tend to belong to the Italian General Confederation of Labour.

Religion 
In the years 2011 and 2012 the ISTAT made a survey regarding the religious affiliation among the immigrants in Italy, the religion of the Indian people in Italy were as follows:
  Sikhism: 64.4%
  Hinduism: 22.0%
  Christianity: 4.6% (of which Catholicism 3.7% and Protestantism 0.9%)
  Muslims: 3.4%
  Buddhism: 0.9%
 Non religious: 1.6%
 Other religions: 3.1%

Notable individuals

See also

 India-Italy relations
 Hinduism in Italy
 Sikhism in Italy
 Italians in India
 Romani people in Italy
 Tamils in Italy

Notes

External links
 Italian Indians: the other side of migration

Italy
Italy
 
India–Italy relations